Cross-country skiing at the 2020 Winter Youth Olympics took  place at Vallée de Joux in Jura, Switzerland.

Events

Medal table

Boys' events

Girls' events

Qualification

Summary

References

External links
Results Book – Cross-Country Skiing

 
Youth Olympics
2020 Winter Youth Olympics events
2020
Youth Olympics